Polva is a rural locality (a selo) in Leninskoye Rural Settlement, Kudymkarsky District, Perm Krai, Russia. The population was 330 as of 2010. There are 9 streets.

Geography 
Polva is located 57 km southwest of Kudymkar (the district's administrative centre) by road. Karpina is the nearest rural locality.

References 

Rural localities in Kudymkarsky District